WMLT (1330 AM, "96.9 The Buzz") is a radio station broadcasting a classic rock format. Licensed to Dublin, Georgia, United States.  The station is currently owned by State Broadcasting Corporation.

References

External links

MLT